Dot 2 Dot (Cantonese 點對點 Dim dui dim) is a 2014 Hong Kong drama film directed by Amos Why, starring Moses Chan, Meng Tingyi, Lam Tze-chung, Susan Shaw Yin-yin and David Siu, first screened at the Hong Kong International Film Festival 2014. It went on general release on 30 October 2014.

Plot
Xiao Xue (Meng Tingyi), a mainland Chinese teacher who has moved to Hong Kong, becomes fascinated by dot patterned graffiti near MTR stations. Convinced that the dots form a pattern, she sets out to crack the code. Along the way she discovers various facets of Hong Kong's distinct history and identity.

Cast 
 Moses Chan - Suet-chung Wong
 Candy Cheung - Sin-yi
 Meng Tingyi
 Lam Tze-chung - Fat man
 Susan Yam Yam Shaw - Headmaster
 David Siu - Daniel Wong
 Amos Why - Policeman

References

External links
 
 Dot 2 Dot at lovehkfilm.com

2014 films
Hong Kong drama films
2010s Cantonese-language films
2010s Mandarin-language films
2010s Hong Kong films